Annelund is a neighbourhood of Malmö, situated in the Borough of Södra Innerstaden, Malmö Municipality, Skåne County, Sweden. As of 2008 it had 1794 inhabitants and covers an area of 17 hectares.

References

Neighbourhoods of Malmö